Chrysallida stefanisi is a species of sea snail, a marine gastropod mollusk in the family Pyramidellidae, the pyrams and their allies. The species is one of a number within the gastropod genus Chrysallida.

Distribution
This species occurs in the following locations:
 Azores Exclusive Economic Zone
 European waters (ERMS scope)

References

External links
 To CLEMAM
 To Encyclopedia of Life
 To World Register of Marine Species

stefanisi
Molluscs of the Atlantic Ocean
Molluscs of the Azores
Gastropods described in 1869